The Technik Museum Sinsheim is a technology museum in Sinsheim, Germany. Opened in 1981, it is run by a registered association called "Auto & Technik Museum Sinsheim e. V." which also runs the nearby Technik Museum Speyer.

Statistics
In addition to exhibitions, the museum also has a  IMAX 3D theatre. It receives more than 1 million visitors per year and is the largest privately owned museum in Europe.

Exhibits

Feature exhibits
In 2003, Air France donated one of its retiring Concorde [aircraft (F-BVFB) to the museum. With a Tupolev Tu-144  already on display since 2001, it is the only place where both supersonic passenger aircraft are shown. Both are fully accessible by the public.

The museum's alliance acquired a Russian shuttle Buran in 2004 which opened as a walk-in exhibition at the Technikmuseum Speyer on 3 October 2008.

Sinsheim Museum also has the largest permanent Formula One collection in Europe along with Ferraris, motorcycles, land speed record holders and classic cars along with a large collection of military tanks, aircraft, and miscellaneous equipment.

The Sinsheim Auto und Technik Museum is open 365 days per year.

Walk-in aircraft

Concorde
Tu-144
Ju 52
Canadair CL-215
Douglas DC-3
Tu-134

Other exhibits 

 300 vintage cars
 Mercedes and Maybach collection
 "American Dream Cars" collection from the 1950s
 40 race and sports cars
 Formula-1 collection
 "Blue Flame" – American rocket-propelled ground vehicle once holding the world speed record.
 200 motorcycles
 27 locomotives
 50 aircraft, including fighters from both world wars and the early jet era, passenger airliners
 150 tractors
 Steam engines and trucks
 Mechanical organs
 Several early jet fighters and other aircraft
 Tanks, artillery and other military equipment.

Access
The museum is easily reached by car and has a large car park. It also has a dedicated railway station as part of the local rail network.

References

External links 
 
 

1981 establishments in West Germany
Museums established in 1981
Museums in Baden-Württemberg
Rhein-Neckar-Kreis
Technology museums in Germany